Gurdeep Singh (born 1 October 1995) is an Indian weightlifter hailing from Khanna town of Punjab. He won the bronze medal in both Commonwealth Weightlifting Championships at 2017 Gold Coast and 2021 Tashkent. In 2018, he broke the national record in the 105+ kg category at the National Weightlifting Championships, winning the gold medal in the process. He won the bronze medal at the 2022 Commonwealth Games in the 109+ kg category.

References

External links

1995 births
Living people
Sportspeople from Ludhiana
Weightlifters from Punjab, India
Weightlifters at the 2022 Commonwealth Games
Commonwealth Games bronze medallists for India
Commonwealth Games medallists in weightlifting
20th-century Indian people
21st-century Indian people
Medallists at the 2022 Commonwealth Games